The Klingenstock (also spelled Chlingenstock) is a mountain of the Schwyzer Alps, located between Stoos and Riemenstalden in the canton of Schwyz.

Its summit is accessible by chair lift from Stoos.

See also
List of mountains of Switzerland accessible by public transport

References

External links
Klingenstock on Hikr

Mountains of the Alps
Mountains of Switzerland
Mountains of the canton of Schwyz
One-thousanders of Switzerland